After All These Years (Instrumental) is the third remix album by American worship collective Bethel Music and their fourteenth album overall. The album was released on July 14, 2017 by the group's imprint label, Bethel Music.

Background
The album is an instrumental collection of songs with an 88-piece orchestra by Bethel Music from Brian & Jenn Johnson's fourth album, After All These Years (2017), a critically acclaimed and commercially successful release by the duo. The album has been promoted as a project that is "intended to be a tool for devotion; an invitation to step away from the distractions of life into peace, clarity and encounter with God's presence."

Critical reception 

 
Jono Davies, reviewing the album for Louder Than The Music, bestowed a rating of four and a half stars, observed "moments of pure brilliance here, and there are moments that are also hauntingly beautiful - and if that wasn't enough, there are also moments that just capture your soul when you start to listen." Davies came to the conclusion that "This album sounds different to most albums out now, but for all the right reasons, and it is such a stunning album. This new album is classical, instrumental and modern orchestral music at its best."

Commercial performance
In the week ending August 5, 2017, After All These Years (Instrumental), was registered on Billboard's Christian Albums chart as the forty third best-selling album of the genre in the United States.

Track listing

Charts

Release history

References 

 

2017 remix albums
Bethel Music albums